Pak Jong-chol (born 2 June 1961) is a North Korean judoka.  He competed in the men's middleweight event at the 1980 Summer Olympics.

References

1961 births
Living people
North Korean male judoka
Olympic judoka of North Korea
Judoka at the 1980 Summer Olympics
Place of birth missing (living people)
Asian Games medalists in judo
Judoka at the 1990 Asian Games
Asian Games bronze medalists for North Korea
Medalists at the 1990 Asian Games
20th-century North Korean people